"Maldito amor" (lit. "Damn Love") is a song by Chilean pop teen girl trio Supernova from their 1999 eponymous debut album.

Released as their second single, it is the trio's most played and most remembered song.

Composition 
The lyrics are by Koko Stambuk. The song was inspired by a real story that happened to a member of the trio, Coni Lewin: she liked a boy at school, but the boy liked her then best female friend who liked the boy in return. Coni told the story to Stambuk, and it took him 20 minutes to write the lyrics.

Music video 
The music video shows the three girls of the trio on a school bus dressed in school uniforms.

Steffi, Trini & Kel cover 

The song was covered by Kel Calderón, Steffi Méndez (daughter of DJ Méndez) and model Trini de la Noi as a promo for the 2014 horror movie  they starred in. The reaction of the Supernova members to the new version was negative.

References 

1999 songs
2000 singles
Supernova (Chilean band) songs